Professional wrestling moves can refer to several types of moves used against opponents in professional wrestling, including:
Professional wrestling aerial techniques
Professional wrestling double-team maneuvers
Professional wrestling holds
Professional wrestling throws
Professional wrestling strikes
Pin (professional wrestling)